The following is a list of tafsir works. Tafsir is a body of commentary and explication, aimed at explaining the meanings of the Qur'an, the central religious text of Islam. Tafsir can broadly be categorized by its affiliated Islamic schools and branches and the era it was published, classic or modern.

Early tafsir

Arabic
 Tanwir al-Miqbas (Tafsir Ibn Abbas) falsely attributed to Abd Allah ibn Abbas (d. 68/687)
 Tafsir al-Kabir (The Great Interpretation) by Muqatil ibn Sulayman (80-150AH). The first full tafsir attributed to Muqatil ibn Sulayman ibn Bashiral-Balkhi.
 Ma’ani al-Qur’an (The Meaning of The Qur’an) by Abu Zakaria al-Farra (207AH).
  Tafsir Sufyan al-Thawri by Sufyan al-Thawri (161 AH/778 CE)
 Tafsir Mujahid ibn Jabr by Mujahid ibn Jabr

English 

Translation

 Tafsir Ibn 'Abbas: Great Commentaries of the Holy Qur'an translated by Mokrane Guezzou. Fons Vitae, Royal Aal al-Bayt Institute for Islamic Thought

Sunni

Arabic 
 Tafsir al-Thalabi by Al-Tha`labi (died 427 AH/1035 CE). Also known as al-Tafsir al-Kabir ('The Great Commentary').
 Ali ibn Ahmad al-Wahidi, a student of Al-Tha`labi wrote four tafsir of the Qur’an:
 Asbab al-Nuzul al-Qur’an (The Causes of the Revelation of the Qur’an)
 Al-Wajiz Fi Tafsir al-Kitabi al-'Aziz (1/2 Volumes)
 Al-Wasit Fi Tafsir al-Qur’an al-Majid (4 Volumes)
 Al-Basit (16/24 Volumes)
 Tafsir al-Tabari (Jami'al-Bayan 'an Ta'wil ay al-Qur'an') by Abu Ja'far Muhammad ibn Jarir Ibn Yazid Al-Tabari (224—310 AH; 839—923 CE). Available online.
 Tafsir Ibn al-Mundhir by Ibn al-Mundhir (318 AH)
 Tafsir Al-Musnad (Tafsir Ibn Abi Hatim) by Abu Muhammad ibn Abi Hatim al-Razi (327 AH)
 Tafsir al Samarqandi by Abu al-Laith al-Samaraqandi
 Ta'wilat Ahl al-Sunnah by Abu Mansur al-Maturidi (d. 333 AH/944 CE) — the author was a Sunni Hanafi jurist, theologian, and scriptural exegete from ninth-century Samarkand who became the eponymous codifier of one of the two principal orthodox schools of Sunni theology, the Maturidi school, which became the dominant theological school for Sunni Muslims in Central Asia and later enjoyed a preeminent status as the school of choice for both the Ottoman Empire and the Mughal Empire.
 An-Nukat wa al-'Uyun by Al-Mawardi (d. 450/1058) — the author was an Islamic jurist of the Shafi'i school.
 Ma'alim al-Tanzil (Outline of the Revelation) by Al-Baghawi (died 510 AH/1116 CE) also known widely as Tafsir al-Baghawi — A popular tafsir amongst Sunni Muslims, it relies heavily on the Tafsir of al-Tha’labi, whilst placing more emphasis on hadith.
 Al-Muharrar al-Wajiz (The Concise Record), commonly known as Tafsir ibn 'Atiyyah after its author, Ibn Atiyyah (d. 541 or 546AH), a Maliki judge from al-Andalus. This Qur’anic commentary is popular in North Africa.
 Zad al-Masir Fi Ilm al-Tafsir by the Hanbali Ash'ari polymath Abu'l-Faraj ibn al-Jawzi (d. 597AH).
 Mafatih al-Ghayb (The Keys to Unseen) by Fakhr al-Din al-Razi (1149—1209 CE/606 AH) also known as Tafsir al-Kabir (The Great Exegesis)
 Tafsir al-Qur’an Al-'Azim by Izz al-Din ibn 'Abd al-Salam
 Anwar al-Tanzil wa Asrar al-Ta'wil by Al-Baydawi (d. 685 AH/1286 CE), also famous as Tafsir al-Baydawi — a shortened version of Al-Kashshaf, with Mu’tazili references altered; printed in two volumes. In Turkey it is often published with marginal notes by a Turkish scholar called 'al-Qunawi' in seven volumes.
 Madarik al-Tanzil wa Haqa'iq al-Ta'wil by Abu al-Barakat al-Nasafi (d. 710)
 Tafsir ibn Kathir (Tafsir al-Quran al-Azim) by Ibn Kathir (1301—1373 CE/ 774 AH). A summary of the earlier interpretation by al-Tabari. Available online. It has been summarized as Mukhtasar Tafsir Ibn Kathir in 3 volumes by Muhammad 'Ali As-Sabuni.
 Lubab al-Ta'wil Fi Ma'ani at-Tanzil by Ala al-Din al-Khazin (d. 741), which is an abridgement of Ma’alimal-Tanzil by Hasan been Mas’ud al-Baghawi.
 Futuhal-Ghawyb Fi Kashfi 'an Qina'i-r-Rawyb (Sharh 'ala Al-Kashshaf) by Shaeawfal-Din al-Husain Ibn 'Abdullahi-tt-Twibi (743 AH)
 Al-Bahr al-Muhit by Abu Hayyan al-Gharnati (d. 745 AH/1344 CE) is a linguistic commentary on the Qur’an primarily from the standpoint of Arabic grammar and rhetoric.
 Bada'i' al-Tafsir and At-Tibbyanu Fi Aymani al-Qur'an by Ibn Qayyim al-Jawziyya (d. 751 AH/1350 CE)
 At-Tahsil li-'Ulumi al-Tanzil by Ibn Juzayy (758 AH/1357 CE)
 Nazm al-Durar fi Tanasub al-Ayi wa al-Suwar (Tafsir al-Biqa'i) by Burhanuddin Ibrahim bin Umar al-Biqa'i
 Jalaluddin al-Suyuti completed:
 Tafsir al-Jalalayn (The Commentary of the Two Jalals) by Jalaluddin al-Mahalli (in 1459), and was subsequently completed, in the same style, by his student, the famous Shafi'i scholar Al-Suyuti (d. 911 AH/1505 CE), who completed it in 1505. This commentary is very popular with Muslims all over the world due to its simplicity. It has also been translated completely by Feras Hamza. Louisville.
 Dur al-Manthur ('The Threaded Pearl Concerning Commentary Based on Traditions'), also by Al-Suyuti. This commentary, in Arabic, concentrates on the narratives that have been transmitted relating to each verse and subject in the Qur’an. It has been published in six volumes.
 Hashiyat al-Sawi 'ala Tafsir al-Jalalayn by Ahmad bin Muhammad as-Sawi al-Maliki
 Fath al-Rahman Fi Tafsir al-Qur'an by Mujir al-Din (d. 927 AH) - the exegete was a Palestinian judge, historian and Hanbali jurist from Jerusalem. Not to be confused with the Persian translation and commentary written by the Muhaddith Shah Waliullah Dehlawi.
 Irshad al-'Aql as-Salim ila Mazaya al-Qur’an al-Karim by Ebussuud Efendi (d.951 AH/1505 CE). Also known as Tafsir Abi Sa’ud.
 Al-Sirawju al-Munir by Al-Khatib al-Shirbini .
 Anwar al-Qur'an wa Asrar al-Furqan by Ali al-Qari, 1004AH, 5 Volumes, published by Daral-Kutub Ilmiyah, Beirut, Lebanon.

Legal Tafsir
 Ahkam al-Qur’an ('The Commands of the Quran') by Al-Jaṣṣās (d. 370 AH/981 CE). Based on the legal rulings of the Hanafi school of Islamic law. This was published in three volumes and remains popular amongst the Hanafis of India, the Middle East and Turkey.
 Ahkam al-Qur’an by Abu Bakr ibn al-Arabi (d.543 AH/1148 CE). The author is also known as 'Qadi ibn al-Arabi' (ibn Arabi, the judge) to distinguish him from the famous Sufi Ibn Arabi. He was a jurist from Andalusia (Muslim Spain) His interpretation has been published in three volumes and contains commentary on the legal rulings of the Qur’an according to the Maliki school.
 Al-Jami' li-Ahkam al-Qur’an (The collection of Qur’anic Injunctions) by Al-Qurtubi (1214—1273 CE/671 AH), the famous Maliki Ash'ari jurist of Cordoba, in Andalusia. This 10-volume tafsir is a commentary on the Qur’anic verses dealing with legal issues. Although the author was a Maliki, he also presents the legal opinions of other major schools of Islamic jurisprudence; thus it is popular with jurists from all of the schools of Islamic law. One volume of this tafsir has been translated into English by Aisha Bewley. Available online.
 Nukat al-Qur’an al-Dallah ala al-Bayan by Al-Qassab (d. 360AH/970CE) a commentary primarily from the viewpoint of applied Islamic law.

Partial and Unfinished Tafsir
 Ma'ani Al-Qur'an al-Karim (unfinished) by Abu Jaʿfar an-Nahhas (d. 338 AH/949 CE) - It contains tafsir from Surah Al-Fatihah to Surah Al-Fath. It has been edited and annotated by Muhammad 'Ali As-Sabina.
 Al-Bustanu Fi I'rawbi Mushkilati al-Qur'an (unfinished) by Ahmad Ibn Ahnaf Abi Bakr Al-Yamani Ibn 'Umar Al-Hanbali (717 AH).
 Rawa'i' al-Tafsir by Ibn Rajab (795 AH)
 Tafsir Ibn 'Arawfah (unfinished) by Ibn Arafa (d. 800/803 AH/ 1400 CE)
 Tafsir Ibn Kamal Basha (unfinished) by Ibn Kemal (d. 940 AH/1536 CE)
 At-Tafsirat al-Ahmadiyyah Fi Bayani al-ayati-sh-Shar'iyyah by Mulla Ahmad Jiwan (d. 1130 AH / 1718 CE). This is the Hanafi tafsir of only those ayat which are concerned with matters of Fiqh.
 Mushkilat al-Qur’an by Anwar Shah Kashmiri, edited with references and one of the introductions by Ahmad Bijnuri, and another introduction by the author's favourite student Muhammad Yusuf Banori. The book predominantly in Arabic but passages in Persian also appear throughout the work. The main objective for undertaking to write this work was to interpret only those verses of the Qur’an which are generally considered to be difficult to understand. A special feature of this particular work is that the author has, in addition, set aside 190 verses that, in his opinion, required further discussion and repeated consideration. Published posthumously in Maligaon, Surat, Gujrat, India, by Majlis al-'Ilmi in 1974.

Modern
 Hashiyah ala Tafsir al-Qadi al-Baydawi by Ibn 'Abidin (d. 1252 AH/1836 CE)
 Tafsir Ash-Sharawi by Muhammad Metwali Alsharawi (1911—1998), a famous Egyptian scholar.
 Al-tafsir al-waset by Muhammad Tantawy (28 October 1928 — 10 March 2010), Grand Imam of Al-Azhar
 Fi Zilal al-Quran ('In the Shade of the Quran') by Sayyid Qutb (1906—1966)
 Muhammad Ali al-Sabuni completed:
 Sawfwat al-Tafasir 
 At-Tafsir al-Wadwih al-Muyassar 
 Rawa'i' al-Bayan Tafsir ayati al-Ahkam mina al-Qur'an 
 Minhat Al-Jalil Fi Bayan ma Fi Ma’alimal-Tanzil by Aziz-ul-Rahman Usmani (d. 1928)
 Tafsir al-Qur'an bi-Kalamal-Rahman by Sanaullah Amritsari
 Ruh al-Ma'ani (The Spirit of Meanings on the Exegesis of the Sublime Qur’an) by Mahmud al-Alusi (d.1270 AH/1854 CE)
 Mawahib al-Rahman Fi Tafsir al-Qur'an by Abdul Karim Mudarris (1980 CE) - the mufti of Iraq and a Shafi'i jurist
 Al-Anwaral-Muttaqin (Asayyid al-Tafasir) - This is the combination of five Tafsirs by six Ash'ari scholars Fakhr al-Din al-Razi, Shams/Shahabal-din AhmadIbn Khawlil Al-Khauli/Khau'i Ad-Dimashqi/Najjmal-Din Ahmad Ibn Muhammad Ibn Abal-Hazm Al-Makhzumi Al-Qawmuli Al-Missri, Al-Qurtubi, Ibn Kathir, Ebussuud Efendi, and Mahmud al-Alusi, edited by Anwar Shah Kashmiri, Muhammad Yusuf Banori, and Muhammad Taqi Usmani
 Aysar al-Tafasir li Kalami al-'Aliyyi al-Kabir by Abu Bakr al-Jazaeri
 al-Iklil ʻala Madarik al-tanzil wa-ḥaqaʼiq al-taʼwil lil-Imam al-Nasafi by Muhammad Abdul Haq bin Shah al-Hindi al-Hanafi (d. 1915 AD) - A commentary of An-Nasafi's Tafsir, with elements ofTafsir al-Baydawi by al-Baydawi and Tafsir Al-Kashshaf by Al-Zamakhshari, which is famous for its linguistic analysis, some of which al-Baydawi and then an-Nasafi amended and some omitted.
 Nahw tafsir mawdu`i li-suwar al-Qur'an al-Karim by Muhammad al-Ghazali
 Tafsir Al-Nabulsi by Mohammed Rateb al-Nabulsi
 Al-Mo'jamul Mufahras Li Alfadh Al-Qur'an Al-Kareem by Mohammad Fuad Abdul Baqi
 al-Tafsir al-Bayan lil Quran al-Karim by Aisha Abd al-Rahman
 Nazarat fi Kitab Allah by Zaynab al-Ghazali
 Al-Mubasir al-Nur al-Quran by Nayla Hashem Sabri
 Taysir al-Tafsir by Fawkiya Ibrahim al-Shirbini

Persian 
Translations
 Tafsir-e-Tabari: a 10th-century translation of the Tafsir al-Tabari in Persian. 
 Tafsir-e-Nasafi: an 11th-century translation and tafsir by Abu Hafs Umar an-Nasafi.

Original
 Mawaheb-e-'Aliyya (Tafsir al-Husaini): by Husayn Kashifi
 Mushkilat al-Qur’an by Anwar Shah Kashmiri, edited with references and one of the introductions by Ahmad Bijnuri, and another introduction by the author's favourite student Muhammad Yusuf Banori. This partial commentary is predominantly in Arabic but passages in the Persian language also appears throughout the work. The main objective for undertaking to write this work was to interpret only those verses of the Holy Qur’an which are generally considered to be difficult to understand. A special feature of this particular work is that the author has, in addition, set aside 190 verses that, in his opinion, required further discussion and repeated consideration. Published posthumously in Maligaon, Surat, Gujrat, India, by Majlis al-'Ilmi in 1974.

Kurdish
 Nami Tafsir by Abdul Karim Mudarris (1980 CE) - the mufti and Shafi'i jurist of Iraq

Urdu 
Translations
Dur al-Manthur by the famous Shafi'i scholar Al-Suyuti (d. 911 AH/1505 CE).
Tafsir Khaza'in-al-Irfan by Naeem-ud-Deen Muradabadi
Tarjumat al-Qur'an by Rafiuddin Deobandi
Tafsir Al-Hawi -Taqrir-e-Anwar al-Tanzil by Fakhral-Hasan Deobandi
 Fadl-e-Rahmani by Anzar Shah Kashmiri
Tafsir Ibn Kathir by Ibn Kathir
Tafsir al-Jalalayn by Jalaluddin al-Mahalli (in 1459), and was subsequently completed, in the same style, by his student, the famous Shafi'i scholar Al-Suyuti (d. 911 AH/1505 CE), translated by Aziz-ul-Rahman Usmani

Original
 Bayan Ul Quran by Ashraf Ali Thanwi
 Dhakhirat al-Janan Fi Fahmi al-Qur’an by Muhammad Sarfaraz Khan Safdar
Jamalayn Fi Sharh Tafsir al-Jalalayn by Muhammad Jamal Bulandshahri Deobandi
Kamalayn Sharh Tafsir al-Jalalayn by Muhammad Na'im Deobandi
Fath al-Mannan also known as "Tafsir-e-Haqqani" by Abu Muhammad 'Abdal-Haqq Haqani
 Ashraf al-Tafasir compiled by Muhammad Taqi Usmani from the Mawa'iz-e-Ashrafiyah of Ashraf Ali Thanvi
 Khulasawt al-Bayan by Muhammad 'Isa Allahabadi
 Ma'ariful Quran by Muhammad Shafi
 Ma'ariful Quran by Muhammad Idris Kandhlawi
 Tafseer-e-Majidi by Abdul Majid Daryabadi
 Anwarul Bayan by Ashiq Ilahi Bulandshahri
 Anwaral-Qur'an by Abal-Kalam Ma'sum
 Ubaidullah Sindhi wrote
 Tafsir-e-Quran 
 Tafsir-e-Mehmud 
 Tafsir-e-Usmani by Mahmud al-Hasan and Shabbir Ahmad Usmani
 Tafsir-e-Basirat-e-Qur'an by Muhammad Asif Qasmi
 Hidayatal-Qur'an by 'Uthman Kashifal-Hashmi Rajupuri and Saeed Ahmad Palanpuri
 Tauzihal-Qur'an (asan Tarjumah-e-Qur'an) by Muhammad Taqi Usmani
 Guldastah-e-Tafsir by 'Abdul-Qayyum Muhajir Madni
 Ruhal-Qur'an by Muhammad Na'im
 Khazain ul Irfan by Naim-ud-Din Muradabadi
 Tadabbur-i-Quran by Amin Ahsan Islahi
 Ma’alimal-'Irfan Fi Durusi al-Qur’an by 'Abdul Hamid-Khan Sawati
 Tafhim al-Quran by Abul A'la Maududi
 Sirat ul-Jinan fi Tafsir il-Quran (Way to heaven) by Qasim Al-Qadri
 Bayan al-Qur'an by Israr Ahmad
 Zikrul-Lil-alamin by Jalaluddin Qasmi
Partial and Unfinished Tafsir
 Ahkam Al-Qur’an (5 Volumes) by Muhammad Ashraf Ali Thanwi, ' Zafar Ahmad Usmani, Jamil Ahmad Thanawi, Muhammad Idris Kandhlawi, and Muhammad Shafi Uthmani, with introduction by Muhammad Taqi Usmani - the 2nd and the 4th Manzil is left to be written.
 Tarjuman al-Quran by Abul Kalam Azad
 Ma'alimal-Qur'an by Muhammad 'Ali As-Swiddiqi Kandhlawi

 Bengali 
Original
 Qur'an Bangla Anubad (কুরআন বাংলা অনুবাদ), by Dr. Zohurul Hoque (1986). Available online
 Tafsir Zakaria by Abubakar Muhammad Zakaria. Available online.
 Tafsir-e-Haqqani) by Shamsul Haque Faridpuri (completed but not fully published yet) - only the first and last Juz' were published but the author completed the manuscript of the Tafsir in approximately 16000 pages and urged his students to publish it but no one has taken up the task of the continuation of the publication yet).
 Nural-Qur'an by Muhammad Aminal-Islam (30 volumes) (1981-1998)
 Tafsir al-Quran by Delwar Hossain Sayidi

Translations
 Ahkam al-Qur’an ('The Commands of the Quran') by Al-Jaṣṣās
 Tafsir Ibn Kathir translated by Akhtar Faruq.
 Tafsir Ibn Kathir translated by Mujibur-Rahman
 Tafsir al-Jalalayn with its Urdu commentaries Jamalayn and Kamalayn by 'Abdal-Ghawffar Shahpuri, Amiral-Islam Faridabadi, and Habibal-Rahman Hobiganji.
 Bayanal-Qur'an by Ashraf Ali Thanwi 
 Tafsir-e-Usmani by Mahmud al-Hasan Deobandi and ' Shabir Ahmad Usmani
 Tafsir-e-Majidi by Abdul Majid Daryabadi
 Ma'ariful Quran by Muhammad Shafi Usmani. Translated from Urdu to Bengali by Muhiuddin Khan. Fully available online. 
 Anwar al-Qur'an by Abal-Kalam Ma'sum, translated by Muhammad Mustawfa
 Tauzih al-Qur'an by Muhammad Taqi Usmani (Introduction by the author's student, Muhammad Abdul Malek) translated by Abal-Bashar Muhammad Saifal-Islam.
 Fi Zilal al-Qur'an by Masihuzzaman Falahi Nadvi, Lar, Deoria Uttar Pradesh
 Tafhim ul Quran by Abul A'la Maududi. Translated from Urdu by Abdul Mannan Talib. Available online.

 English 

Original
 The Noble Quran: Meaning With Explanatory Notes by Taqi Usmani
 The Majestic Quran: An English Rendition of Its Meanings translation and commentary by Nureddin Uzunoglu, Ali Ozek, Tevfik Rüştü Topuzoğlu, and Mehmet Maksutoğlu

Translations
 Tafsir Ibn Kathir by Ibn Kathir is available as:
 Tafsir ibn Kathir: The Exegesis of the Grand Holy Qur'an translated by Muhammad Mahdi Al-Sharif. Daral-Kutub 'Ilmiyah, Beirut, Lebanon 2006.
 Tafsir Ibn Kathir translated by Safiur-Rahman Al Mubarakpuri and team, Darussalam Publications.
 Tafsir Ibn Kathir (Abridged) translated by Muhammad Anis Gad Khalil, Dar al-Manarah
 Qur’an Made Easy by Shabir Ahmad Usmani, Afzal Husen Elias, Ismail Ibrahim, and Ismail Khathrada.
 Tafsir-e-Uthmani by Mahmud Hasan Deobandi and Shabir Ahmad Usmani has been translated as:
 The Glorious Qur'an based on the Tafsir-e-'Uthmani translated and edited by the teachers of Madrasah Ayesha Siddiqua, Karachi. Al-Bushra Publishers
 Tafsir-e-Uthmani translated by Mohammad Ashfaq Ahmad, Idara Impex, India
 Ma'ariful Quran by Muhammad Shafi Usmani. Translated from Urdu to English. Fully available online. 
 Illuminating Discourses on the Noble Qur’an by Ashiq Ilahi Bulandshahri, translated into English by Ismail Ebrahim, and edited by Ismail Khathrada and Afzal Hoosen Elias
 Tafhim al-Quran by Abul A'la Maududi translated as Towards Understanding the Qur'an 
 Nahw tafsir mawdu`i li-suwar al-Qur'an al-Karim by Muhammad al-Ghazali has been translated as A Thematic Commentary on the Qur’an translated by A.A Shamis, The International Institute of Islamic Thought (IIIT)
 Journey Through The Qur'an: The Content and Context of the Suras translated by Aisha Bewley
 Tafsir al-Qur’an (also known as: Tafsir-e-Majidi) by Abdul Majid Daryabadi
 Tafsir al-Tabari by al-Tabari has been partially translated by Scott Lucas as Selections from The Comprehensive Exposition of the Interpretation of the Verses of the Qur'an in two volumes, Islamic Texts Society
 Fi Zilal al-Qur'an by Sayyid Qutb has been translated as In the Shade of the Quran by Adil Salahi and A.A Shamis, Islamic Foundation
 The Noble Quran: Meaning With Explanatory Notes by Muhammad Taqi Usmani
 Tadabbur-e-Qur'an has been translated as Pondering over the Qur'an by Mohammad Saleem Kayani. Incomplete, in two volumes, Islamic Book Trust 
 Tafsir al-Jalalayn by Jalal ud Din Suyuti and Jalal ud Din al Mahalli has been translated as:
 Tafsir al-Jalalayn: Complete English Translation by Aisha Bewley, Dar al-Taqwa
 Tafsir al Jalayan: Great Commentaries of the Holy Qur'an translated by Feras Hamza, Royal Aal al-Bayt Institute for Islamic Thought, Fons Vitae
 Tafsir al-Kabir by al-Razi has been partially translated as The Great Exegesis: al-Tafsir al-Kabir by Sohaib Saeed. Royal Aal al-Bayt Institute for Islamic Thought, Islamic Texts Society

 Sindhi 
 Tafsir Al-Maqam Al-Mahmud by Ubaidullah Sindhi.
 Tafsir Surah Saba by Ghulam Mustafa Qasmi.

Malay
 Tafsir At Tibbyan by Abdul Hadi Awang

 Indonesian 
 Tafsir al-Azhar by Hamka.
 Tafsir Al-Mishbah by Quraish Shihab

 Turkish 

 Risale-i Nur by Said Nursî (1878—1960) written mainly in Turkish, is a large work, with four main volumes. It consists of extensive exegesis of certain verses and explanation of the fundamentals of how to approach the Qur’an. It especially explains the verses that 21st century people need most. In other words, it studies the verses about the six articles of belief of Islam such as believing in God and the day of judgment. It also gives logical answers to the questions asked by Atheists. This work is written in a more accessible style to the general public and is translated into 52 languages.Risale-i Nur hakkında herşey burada
 Elmalılı Tefsir by Elmalılı Muhammed Hamdi Yazır. Published in 10 volumes, it remains one of the most popular commentaries in Turkish.
 Okuyucu Tefsiri by Semra Kürün Çekmegil - The first tafsir written by a female Turkish scholar
 Kur’an Tahlili: Arapça Gramer Işığında Sözlük-Meal-Tefsir by Necla Yasdıman

 Salafi Sunni 

Arabic
 Tafsir al-Manar by Rashid Rida (1865—1935) It served as his avenue for propagating his thoughts on Islamic Modernism.
 Fath al-Qadir by Muhammad ash-Shawkani.
 Mahasin al-Ta'wil (Tafsir Al-Qasimi) by Jamal al-Din Qasimi (1283-1332 AH/1914 CE)
 Tafsir As-Sa'di by Abdul-Rahman al-Sa'di

BengaliTafsir al-Quran by Muhammad Asadullah Al-Ghalib
 Tafsir-Aini 1-15 Parah/Juz' (Volume-I & II) explained by Ainul Bari Aliavi. Published by Sufia Prakashani, Kolkata, India.  (volume-I) &  (Volume-II).

English

Original
 Tafsir Ishraq Al-Ma'ani (1997-2007) by Syed Iqbal Zaheer. In eight volumes, this tafsir summarizes the exegesis of the most prominent writings of Muslim scholars from Tabari to Sayyid Qutb from a Salafi perspective.

Translation
 Tafseer as-Sa'di by Abdul-Rahman al-Sa'di, translated by Nasiruddin al-Khattab and edited by Huda Khattab, International Islamic Publishing House (from Arabic)
 Ahasanul Bayan by Hafiz Salahuddin Yusuf, translated by Mohammad Kamal Myshkat, Dar-us-Salam Publications (from Urdu)

Urdu

 Ahasanul Bayan by Hafiz Salahuddin Yusuf

 Twelver Shia 

 Arabic 

Classic
 Tafsir Qomi by Ali Ibn Ibrahim Qomi ( ?? – 919 CE)
 Tafsir Ayyashi by Mohammad ibn Masoud Ayyashi (died 932 CE)
 Tafsir Furat Kufi by Furat Ibn Furat Ibn Ibrahim al-Kufi. (died 964 CE)
 Tafsir al-Nu'mani by Muhammad b. Ibrahim al-Nu'mani (died 971 CE)
 Al-Tibbyan Fi Tafsir al-Quran by Shaikh Tusi (995 – 1067 CE)
 Majma' al-Bayan by Shaykh Tabarsi (1073 – 1153 CE)
 Zubdat al-tafasir by Molla Fathollah Kashani (d. 1580 CE / 988 A.H.)
 Al-Burhan Fi Tafsir al-Quran by Syed Hashimal-Bahrani (died 1696 CE)
 Tafsir Nur al-Thaqalayn by Abd al-Ali ibn Juma Arusi (died 1701 CE)

JurisprudentialZubdat al-bayan by Mohaghegh Ardabili (d. 993 A.H/1585 CE) Fiqh al-Qur'an by al-Sayyid Qutb al-Rawandi (d. 573 AH/1177 CE) 

Partial and Unfinished Tafsir
 Tafsir Imam Ja'far al-Sadiq collection of hadiths reportedly narrated by Imam Ja'far al-Sadiq (A.S) (83 – 148AH). 
 Tafsir Imam Hasan Askari attributed to Imam Hasan al-Askari 

Modern
 Tafsir Shobar by Abdullah Alavi Hosseini Mosavi. (d. 1242 AH/ 1827 CE)Mawahib al-Rahman Fi Tafsir al-Qur'an by Abd al-A'la al-Sabziwari (1910 – 1993 CE)
 Al-Bayan Fi Tafsir al-Quran by Abu al-Qasim al-Khoei (1899 - 1992 CE)
 Tafsir al-Mizan by Muhammad Husayn Tabataba'i (1904 – 1981 CE). explanation of Quranic verses with the help of other relevant verses. English version is available as well.
 Al-Forghan fi Tafsir al-Quran by Mohammad Sadeqi Tehrani (1926 – 2011) Tafsir Hedayat (Min Hadi Al-Quran) by Mohammad Taqi al-Modarresi (b. 1945 CE – Present)

TranslationsAl-Amthal fi Tafsir al-Qur'an by Naser Makarem Shirazi (1927 CE – Present) (translated of Tafsir Nemuneh from Persian to Arabic).Nafahat al-Quran by Naser Makarem Shirazi (1927 CE – Present) [Thematic Exegesis] (translated of Payam-i Qur'an from Persian to Arabic).Mafahim al-Quran by Ja'far Sobhani (1929 CE - Present). [Thematic Exegesis] (translated of Manshur jawid from Persian to Arabic).Tasnim Tafsir by Abdollah Javadi-Amoli (1933 CE – present) (translated from Persian to Arabic).

 Persian 

 Rawz al-jinan wa ruh al-jinan (Historical Exegesis) by Abu al-Futuh al-Razi (1078 – 1157/61 CE)Tafsir Gazur (jalāʼ al-adhhān wa-jalāʼ al-aḥzān) by Abul al-Mahasin Husayn Ibn Hasan Jurjani (1377~1341 CE)
 Menhaj Al-Sadeghin by Molla Fathollah Kashani (d. 1580 CE / 988 A.H.)Tafsir al-Mizan by Muhammad Husayn Tabataba'i (1904 – 1981 CE). (translated from Arabic to Persian)..
 Tafsir Novin by Mohammad Taghi Shariati (b.1907 - d.1987)
 Partoie Az Qur’an by Mahmoud Taleghani (1911 – 1979 CE)
 Tafsir Roshan by Mirza Hassan Mostafavi (1913 – 2005 CE)
 Tafsir Nemuneh by Naser Makarem Shirazi (1927 CE – Present).
 Tafsir ahsan al-hadith by Ali Akbar Qarashi (b. 1928 CE)
 Tarjomane Foraghan by Mohammad Sadeqi Tehrani (1926 – 2011 CE)Payam-i Qur'an by Naser Makarem Shirazi (1927 CE – Present) [Thematic Exegesis].Manshur jawid by Ja'far Sobhani (1929 CE – Present). [Thematic Exegesis].Tasnim Tafsir by Abdollah Javadi-Amoli (1933 CE – present).Tafsir Rahnama by Akbar Hashemi Rafsanjani (1934 – 2017 CE)Tafsir Nur by contemporary scholar Mohsin Qara'ati (1945 CE – present)
 Tafsir Hedayat by Mohammad Taqi al-Modarresi (b. 1945 CE – Present) (translated from Arabic to Persian).Tafsir Meshkat by contemporary scholar Mohammad-ali Ansari
 Makhzan al-Irfan fi Tafsir al-Quran by Banu Amin (1886–1983)
 Tafasiral-Quran by Mulla Sadra (1571/72 – 1635/40 CE / 980 – 1050 AH) (Philosophical Exegesis) (translated from Arabic to Persian).

 English 
Translation
 Tafsir al-Mizan by Muhammad Husayn Tabataba'i (1904 – 1981 CE). (translated from Arabic to English by Sa'id Akhtar Rizvi).
 An Enlightening Commentary into the Light of the Holy Qur'an by Kamal Faqih Imani (translated from Persian to English by Abbas Sadr-'ameli).Tafsir Nemuneh by Naser Makarem Shirazi (1927 CE – Present) (translated from Persian to English).
 The Qur'an Interpretation. 2 vols. by Mohammed-Ali Hassan Al-Hilly (1968, Iraq), translated by E. A. Nassir (2016, Beirut). The Qur'an Interpretation (2 vol). (from Arabic)
 Urdu 

TranslationTafsir Nemuneh by Naser Makarem Shirazi (1927 CE – Present) (translated from Persian to Urdu).
 Al-Mizan by Muhammad Husayn Tabataba'i (1904 – 1981 CE). (Has translated into Urdu by Hassan Raza Ghadiri)
 Tafsir-e-Mauzui by Naser Makarem Shirazi (1927 CE – Present) [Thematic Exegesis] (translated of Payam-i Qur'an into Urdu by Syed Safdar Hussain Najafi).
 Tafsir-e-Mauzui by Ja‘far Sobhani (1929 CE – Present). [Thematic Exegesis] (translated of Manshur jawid into Urdu by Syed Safdar Hussain Najafi).

Original

 Tafsir Anwar-e-Najaf fi Asrar Mushaf by Hussain Bakhsh Jarra (1920 – 1990 CE)
 Al Kauthar fi Tafsir al-Quran by Mohsin Ali Najafi (1938 CE - Present)

Zaydi Shia

Arabic
 Tafsir Furat Kufi by Furat Ibn Furat Ibn Ibrahim al-Kufi
 Al-Burhan by Abu'l-Fath an-Nasir ad-Dailami
 Taysir at-Tafsir by Badreddin al-Houthi

 Sufi 

 Arabic 
 Tafsir al-Qur'an al-Azim by Sahl al-Tustari (d. 283/897)
 Ruh al-Bayan by Ismail Hakki Bursevi (1653—1725 CE). A ten-volume Arabic work by the founder of the Hakkiyye Jelveti Sufi Order from Turkey.
 Haqa'iq al-tafsir by Abu Abd Rahman al-Sulami (d. 412/1021)
 Ara'is al-Bayan fi haqa'iq al-Koran by Abu Mohammad Shirazi (d. 606/1209)
 Bahr al-Madid ('The Immense Ocean') by Ahmad ibn Ajiba (1747—1809 CE), generally known as Tafsir ibn Ajibah — an 6/8 volume work by a Moroccan Sheikh of the Darqarwi branch of the Shadhili Order of Sufism.
 Laṭā'if al-Isharat bi-Tafsir al-Qur'ān by Al-Qushayri
 Al-Mohit al-azam by Haydar Amuli that was completed around 1375 or 1376 CE
 Tafsir al-Mazhari by Qadi Thanaullah Panipati
 Ghara'ib al-Qur'an wa Ragha'ib al-Furqan by Nizam al-Din al-Nisaburi (d. 728/1328)
 Tafsir Safi by Mohsen Fayz Kashani (?? – 1680 CE)
 Tafasir al-Quran (Philosophical Exegesis) by Mulla Sadra (1571/72 – 1635/40 CE / 980 – 1050 AH)
 Bayan al-Sa‘ada (19th century) by Sultan Alishah
 '''Ara'is al-bayan fi ḥaqa'iq al-Qur'an (Brides of Elucidation in the Truths of the Quran) by Ruzbihan Baqli
 al-Tawilat al-Najmiyah by Najamuddin Daya (d. 654/1261) and Ala al-Dawla Simnani (d. 736/1330)

Bengali

Translation
 Tafsir-e-Mazhari by Qadi Thanaullah Panipati, translated by Mamunal-Rawshid

English 

Original
 The Qur'an with Annotated Interpretation in Modern English by Ali Ünal - Ünal is a member of the Gülenist movement.

Translations
 Asrar al-Tanzil by Ameer Muhammad Akram Awan (from Urdu)
 Laṭā'if al-Isharat bi-Tafsir al-Qur'ān has been partially translated as Abu'l-Qasim Al-Qushayri's Lata'if Al-Isharat: Subtleties of The Allusions by Kristin Zahra Sands, Dar Ul Thaqafah
 A Sufi Commentary on the Qur'an: Ta'wilat al-Qur'an by Abd al-Razzaq Al-Kashani, translated by Khalid Williams. The Royal Aal al-Bayt Institute for Islamic Thought, Islamic Texts Society
 Tafsir Al-Tustari: Great Commentaries on the Holy Qur’an translated by Annabel and Ali Keeler, The Royal Aal al-Bayt Institute for Islamic Thought, Fons Vitae

Persian

 Kashf al-Asrar by Rashid al-Din Maybudi
 Fath al-Aziz: an 18th-century tafsir in Persian by Shah Abdul Aziz Dehlavi, son of Shah Waliullah Dehlawi. (A large part of this Tafsir was lost in 1847 CE along with his commentary on Sunan Abu Dawud.)

Sindhi
 Ahsan ul Bayan by Allama Muhammad Idris Dahiri in 9 volumes.

Urdu

Translations
 Tafsir-e-Mazhari by Qadi Thanaullah Panipati (from Arabic)
Tafsir-e-Jawahir-e-'Azizi (Translation of Fath al-'Azizi) by Shah Abdul Aziz Muhaddith Dehlavi (from Persian)

Original

 Tafsir Zia ul Quran by Muhammad Karam Shah al-Azhari.
 Amir Muhammad Akram Awan wrote:
 Akram al-Tafasir 
 Asrar al-Tanzil 
 Bayan Ul Quran by Ashraf Ali Thanvi.
 Sabq al-ghayat fi nasaq al-ayat by Ashraf Ali Thanvi.
 Hawashi-e-Qur'an Majid by Shah 'Abdul Qadir Dihlawi and Ahmad 'Ali Lahori

Mu'tazila 

 Al-Kashshaf by Al-Zamakhshari (d. 539 AH/1144 CE). - Considered to be the standard work of Mu'tazila tafsir, with emphasis on Arabic grammar and lexicography. The author later converted to Sunni Islam.

Ibadi

Arabic

Tafsir Kitab Allah al-Aziz by Hud ibn Muhakkam al-Hawwari
 Muhammad ibn Yusuf Attafayish (1821 - 1914), a preeminent Algerian Ibadi scholar, wrote three tafsir 

 Da‘i l-‘Amal li- Yawm al-Ajal (incomplete)
 Himyan al-Zad ild Dar al-Ma‘ad
 Taysir al-Tafsir

 Jawahir al-Tafasir by Ahmed bin Hamad al-Khalili

Ahmadi

Urdu 

 Haqaiq al-furqan by Hakeem Noor-ud-Din
 Tafseer-e-Kabeer by Mirza Basheer-ud-Din Mahmood Ahmad. Its shortened version is Tafseer-e-Sagheer.

English 

 The English Commentary of the Holy Quran translated by Maulvi Sher Ali, Mirza Bashir Ahmad and Malik Ghulam Farid.

Modernist

Arabic 

 Tafsir al-Tahrir wa'l-Tanwir (1984) by Muhammad al-Tahir ibn Ashur. Notable of its emphasis on the rhetorical aspect of the Qur’an.

Urdu 
 Al-Bayan by Javed Ahmad Ghamidi

English 
 The Message of the Qur'an by Muhammad Asad, 1980.

Other

English 
 The Study Qur’an — authored by an editorial collective led by noted Islamic philosopher Seyyed Hossein Nasr, published in 2015 by HarperCollins. This work seeks to highlight the depth and diversity of interpretations that exist within traditional Islam, drawing on 40 major classical commentaries from a wide range of orientations, including both Sunni and Shi'a viewpoints, the Maturidi, Ashari, Mutazili and Athari schools of Islamic theology, as well as Sufi interpretations; but excluding modern reformist and fundamentalist views. Has been hailed by academics as an unparalleled reference work in the field of Islamic studies.
 The Ascendant Qur'an: Realigning Man to the Divine Power Culture by Muhammad al Asi

Urdu

See also 
 Qur’an
 Tafsir
 English translations of the Quran
 List of Quran interpreters
 List of Islamic texts

Notes

External links 
 Quran Archive - Commentary of the Quran Biography of selected classical and modern commentaries of the Quran.
 
 
 
 

Quran-related lists
Religious bibliographies